The 2018–19 St. Francis Brooklyn Terriers men's basketball team represented St. Francis College during the 2018–19 NCAA Division I men's basketball season. The Terrier's home games are played at the Generoso Pope Athletic Complex. The team has been a member of the Northeast Conference since 1981. They are coached by Glenn Braica, who was in his ninth year at the helm of the Terriers.

The Terriers Northeast Conference record was 9–9, earning them the 5th seed in the NEC tournament. In the opening round of the tournament, they lost to the 4th seeded Robert Morris Colonials, 65–69 in overtime. The Terriers 17 wins in the 2018–19 campaign were the most since the 2013–14 season when they won 18 games.

On March 13, it was announced that the Terriers were selected to participate in the 2019 CollegeInsider.com Postseason Tournament. They lost in the first round to Hampton.

Previous season
The Terriers finished the 2017–18 season 13–18, 10–8 in NEC play. It marked a return to the NEC tournament as the Terriers gained the #5 seed and lost on the road to #4 LIU Brooklyn.

Offseason

The Terriers unveiled a new basketball floor located in the Pope Physical Education Center. The new court replaces the original one that was installed in 1969.

Departures

Class of 2018 signees

Incoming transfers

Regular season

St. Francis Brooklyn completed the non-conference portion of their schedule with an 8–7 record. The Terriers had road wins against Lafayette, Niagara, and a tough Presbyterian squad that finished the season 20–16. At home the Terriers defeated Manhattan, Saint Peter's, and UMass Lowell. The eight non-conference wins were one shy of tying the NEC non-conference wins record which the Terriers set back in 2013-14. The eight non-conference wins were one shy of tying the NEC non-conference wins record which the Terriers set back in 2013-14.

The Terriers Northeast Conference schedule resulted in a 9–9 record, which was good for a fifth-place finish. The St. Francis margin of victory over the course of their 18 NEC contests was only 0.5 points (70.3 to 69.8).

Postseason

After finishing the regular season 17-15 the Terriers were selected to participate in the 2019 CIT. This was their first winning season since 2014–15 when they went 23-12 and were invited to the 2015 NIT. In the tournament, St. Francis Brooklyn faced Hampton, their first game against each other in history. The Terriers lost to Hampton 72–81 in the opening round of the CIT.

Roster

Schedule and results

|-
!colspan=12 style="background:#0038A8; border: 2px solid #CE1126;;color:#FFFFFF;"| Non-conference regular season

|-
!colspan=12 style="background:#0038A8; border: 2px solid #CE1126;;color:#FFFFFF;"| Northeast Conference regular season

|-
!colspan=12 style="background:#0038A8; border: 2px solid #CE1126;;color:#FFFFFF;"| Northeast Conference tournament

|-
!colspan=12 style="background:#0038A8; border: 2px solid #CE1126;;color:#FFFFFF;"| CollegeInsider.com Postseason Tournament
 
|-

source

Accolades

Glenn Sanabria, red-shirt senior guard
Selected to All-NEC Third Team
Selected to the National Association of Basketball Coaches (NABC) All-District 18 Second Team
Selected to the 2019 Division I-AAA Athletics Directors Association Scholar-Athlete Team
Jalen Jordan, sophomore guard

Selected to All-NEC Second Team
Selected to the National Association of Basketball Coaches (NABC) All-District 18 Second Team

See also
2018–19 St. Francis Brooklyn Terriers women's basketball team

References

St. Francis Brooklyn Terriers men's basketball seasons
Saint Francis Brooklyn
Saint Francis Brooklyn Terriers men's basketball
Saint Francis Brooklyn Terriers men's basketball
Saint Francis Brooklyn